The Fortieth Wisconsin Legislature convened from  to  in regular session.  They met again for two special sessions in June 1892 and October 1892 to pass redistricting laws.  The extra sessions were necessitated by court cases which threw out the Legislature's previous attempts at redistricting.  The final redistricting act was signed just 12 days before the 1892 general election.

This was the first session where the Democratic Party had full control of the Legislature since 1854.

Senators representing odd-numbered districts were newly elected for this session and were serving the first two years of a four-year term. Assembly members were elected to a two-year term. Assembly members and odd-numbered senators were elected in the general election of November 4, 1890. Senators representing even-numbered districts were serving the third and fourth year of a four-year term, having been elected in the general election of November 6, 1888.

Major events
 January 5, 1891: Inauguration of George Wilbur Peck as the 17th Governor of Wisconsin.
 January 28, 1891: William Freeman Vilas elected United States Senator by the Wisconsin Legislature in joint session.
 April 3, 1891: Wisconsin Supreme Court justice David Taylor died in office.
 April 7, 1891: Silas U. Pinney was elected to the Wisconsin Supreme Court, to the seat being vacated by the retirement of Orsamus Cole.
 May 4, 1891: John B. Winslow was appointed to the Wisconsin Supreme Court by Governor George Wilbur Peck, to replace David Taylor.
 August 17, 1891: The French Republic and Russian Empire formed a defensive alliance.
 January 4, 1892: As the senior-most member of the court, William P. Lyon became the 7th chief justice of the Wisconsin Supreme Court due to the retirement of Orsamus Cole.  He was the first chief justice to obtain the office under the new amendment to the Wisconsin Constitution ratified in 1889.
 March 22, 1892: The Wisconsin Supreme Court struck down the redistricting law passed by the Legislature, in the case State ex rel. Attorney General v. Cunningam.
 September 27, 1892: The Wisconsin Supreme Court struck down the second redistricting law passed by the Legislature, in the case State ex rel. Lamb v. Cunningham.
 November 8, 1892: 1892 United States general election:
 Grover Cleveland elected President of the United States for a second non-consecutive term.
 George Wilbur Peck re-elected as Governor of Wisconsin.

Major legislation

Regular session
 February 5, 1891: An Act to repeal chapter 519, of the laws of the state of Wisconsin for the year 1889, entitled, "An act concerning the education and employment of children." 1891 Act 4.  Repealed the entire "Bennett Law" due to its provision requiring English language education.
 April 25, 1891: An Act to apportion the state into senate and assembly districts, 1891 Act 482. First attempt to pass a legislative redistricting.  This law was struck down by the Wisconsin Supreme Court in March 1892.
 April 25, 1891: An Act to apportion the state into congressional districts, 1891 Act 483. 
 Joint resolution agreeing to a proposed amendment to sub-division 9, of section 31, of article IV of the constitution of the state of Wisconsin, 1891 Joint Resolution 4. This was the required second legislative passage of a proposed amendment to prohibit the Legislature from making private laws affecting specific city charters.  The amendment was ratified by referendum at the November 1892 general election.

First special session
 July 1, 1892: An Act to apportion the state of Wisconsin into senate and assembly districts, 1892 Special Session 1 Act 1.  This was the second attempt to pass a legislative redistricting.  This map was also struck down by the Wisconsin Supreme Court, in September 1892.

Second special session
 October 27, 1892: An Act to apportion the state of Wisconsin into senate and assembly districts, 1892 Special Session 2 Act 1.  This was the third and final attempt to pass a legislative redistricting based on the 1890 U.S. census.  This map was utilized for the 1892 election, held just 12 days after the law was signed.
 October 27, 1892: An Act relating to the general election to be held on the eighth day of November, in the year 1892, and to notices thereof and nominations therefor, and for other purposes, 1892 Special Session 2 Act 2.  Due to the lateness of the legislative redistricting, it was necessary to clarify the status of existing nominees for the legislature and create special procedures for candidates to get on the ballot for the November 1892 general election.

Party summary

Senate summary

Assembly summary

Sessions
 1st Regular session: January 14, 1891April 25, 1891
 1892 special session 1: June 28, 1892July 1, 1892
 1892 special session 2: October 17, 1892October 27, 1892

Leaders

Senate leadership
 President of the Senate: Charles Jonas (D)
 President pro tempore: Frederick W. Horn (D)

Assembly leadership
 Speaker of the Assembly: James J. Hogan (D)

Members

Members of the Senate
Members of the Senate for the Fortieth Wisconsin Legislature:

Members of the Assembly
Members of the Assembly for the Fortieth Wisconsin Legislature:

Committees

Senate committees
 Senate Committee on AgricultureAdam Apple, chair
 Senate Committee on Assessment and Collection of TaxesFrederick W. Horn, chair
 Senate Committee on EducationRussel C. Falconer, chair
 Senate Committee on Enrolled BillsWilliam F. Voss, chair
 Senate Committee on Engrossed BillsF. T. Yahr, chair
 Senate Committee on Federal RelationsRobert J. MacBride, chair
 Senate Committee on Finance, Banks, and InsuranceEnos W. Persons, chair
 Senate Committee on IncorporationsRobert J. MacBride, chair
 Senate Committee on the JudiciaryWilliam Kennedy, chair
 Senate Committee on Legislative ExpendituresHenry Conner, chair
 Senate Committee on Manufacturing and CommerceHerman Kroeger, chair
 Senate Committee on Military AffairsJ. H. Woodnorth, chair
 Senate Committee on Privileges and ElectionsRobert Lees, chair
 Senate Committee on Public LandsGeorge W. Pratt, chair
 Senate Committee on RailroadsWalter S. Greene, chair
 Senate Committee on Roads and BridgesJohn Fetzer, chair
 Senate Committee on State AffairsGeorge W. Pratt, chair
 Senate Committee on Town and County OrganizationsJohn T. Kingston, chair

Assembly committees
 Assembly Committee on AgricultureJohn Dawson, chair
 Assembly Committee on Assessment and Collection of TaxesJ. E. Dodge, chair
 Assembly Committee on Bills on their Third ReadingH. E. Briggs, chair
 Assembly Committee on CitiesDennis T. Phalen, chair
 Assembly Committee on EducationH. J. Desmond, chair
 Assembly Committee on Engrossed BillsC. Hugo Jacobi, chair
 Assembly Committee on Enrolled BillsJ. Tormey, chair
 Assembly Committee on Federal RelationsClinton Textor, chair
 Assembly Committee on IncorporationsR. J. McGeehan, chair
 Assembly Committee on Insurance, Banks, and BankingGustave S. Luscher, chair
 Assembly Committee on the JudiciaryJohn Winans, chair
 Assembly Committee on Legislative ExpendituresM. E. Burke, chair
 Assembly Committee on Labor and ManufacturesA. McGuigan, chair
 Assembly Committee on Lumber and MiningJames A. Taylor, chair
 Assembly Committee on Medical SocietiesE. L. Bullard, chair
 Assembly Committee on MilitiaJohn J. Oswald, chair
 Assembly Committee on Privileges and ElectionsJ. P. Nolan, chair
 Assembly Committee on Public ImprovementsW. H. Fitzgerald, chair
 Assembly Committee on Public LandsConrad Krez, chair
 Assembly Committee on RailroadsEdward Keogh, chair
 Assembly Committee on Roads and BridgesE. C. Smith, chair
 Assembly Committee on State AffairsJ. W. Watson, chair
 Assembly Committee on Town and County OrganizationTheo. Knapstein, chair
 Assembly Committee on Ways and MeansJohn Edwards, chair

Joint committees
 Joint Committee on ApportionmentW. S. Greene (Sen.) & John Winans (Asm.), co-chairs
 Joint Committee on Charitable and Penal InstitutionsM. C. Mead (Sen.) & Neal Brown (Asm.), co-chairs
 Joint Committee on ClaimsW. F. Nash (Sen.) & R. M. Crawford (Asm.), co-chairs
 Joint Committee on PrintingC. A. Koenitzer (Sen.) & W. V. McMullen (Asm.), co-chairs
 Joint Committee on RetrenchmentRobert Lees (Sen.) & J. E. Dodge (Asm.), co-chairs

Employees

Senate employees
 Chief Clerk: Jon P. Hume
 Assistant Chief Clerk: Sam J. Shafer
 Assistant Clerk: Jackson Silbaugh
 Bookkeeper: Edward Malone
 Engrossing Clerk: L. S. Truesdell
 Assistant Engrossing Clerk: M. P. Persons
 Enrolling Clerk: Jno G. Faulds
 Assistant Enrolling Clerk: H. F. Gustavus
 Transcribing Clerk: C. M. Gardner
 Assistant Transcribing Clerks: 
 Hugo Imig
 Agnes Muller
 Proofreader: E. R. Petherick
 Index Clerk: Cora Cornish
 Clerk for the Judiciary Committee: Frank T. Smith
 Clerk for the Committee on Incorporations: Joseph Sims
 Clerk for the Committee on Claims: David C. Gowdey
 Clerk for the Committee on Engrossed Bills: F. J. Collignon
 Clerk for the Committee on Enrolled Bills: B. A. Weatherby
 Clerk for the Committee on Charitable and Penal Institutions: Amy Robinson
 Document Clerk: Fred Herrmann
 Sergeant-at-Arms: John A. Barney
 Assistant Sergeant-at-Arms: W. H. Putnam
 Postmaster: Peter Spehn
 Assistant Postmaster: George McHenry
 Gallery Attendant: Tobias Jacobson
 Document Room Attendant: James P. Evans
 Committee Room Attendants:
 Louis Birlman
 Farrel Golden
 Comparing Clerks:
 A. G. Pankow
 Oscar Osthelder
 Doorkeepers:
 H. B. Loy
 R. Tuttle
 Jacob Staumes
 M. Riedy
 Porter: Peter Blair
 Night Watch: L. J. Pringel
 Janitor: Fred Brandt
 Custodian of the Enrolling Room: L. F. Terhune
 Custodian of the Engrossing Room: E. M. Keogh
 Night Laborer: John D. Fay
 Messengers:
 Tom Kingston
 J. E. Taylor
 Berthold Husting
 John Manchester
 Ben Richmond
 Al De Boise
 Warren Persons
 James Raymen
 R. MacBride
 Fred Klenert

Assembly employees
 Chief Clerk: G. W. Porth
 1st Assistant Clerk: W. L. Houser
 2nd Assistant Clerk: E. D. Doney
 Bookkeeper: J. T. Huntington
 Engrossing Clerk: William F. Collins
 Assistant Engrossing Clerk: James Pennefeather
 Enrolling Clerk: A. Goerz
 Assistant Enrolling Clerk: Edward E. Fitzgibbon
 Transcribing Clerk: C. H. Tenney
 Assistant Transcribing Clerks: 
 George Silbernagel
 Daniel F. O'Keefe
 Index Clerk: Charles A. Leicht
 Stationary Clerk: C. E. Moseley
 Comparing Clerks:
 A. F. Campbell
 J. F. Cotter
 Clerk for the Judiciary Committee: F. C. Burpee
 Clerk for the Committee on Enrolled Bills: William Boyington
 Clerk for the Committee on Engrossed Bills: Julius Gamm
 Clerk for the Committee on Agriculture: C. H. Lambert
 Clerk for the Committee on Third Reading: Edward L. Hardy
 Clerk for the Committee on Railroads: Ed. S. Quinn
 Clerk for the Committee on Town and County Organization: Edw. Pape
 Document Clerk: Ulrich Wetstein
 Custodian of the Enrolling Room: Geirge Reinsch
 Sergeant-at-Arms: P. Whalen
 Assistant Sergeant-at-Arms: Eugene Courtney
 Postmaster: J. A. Venus
 Assistant Postmaster: Holmes Daubner
 Doorkeepers:
 John O'Keif
 Frank Boyer
 P. H. McClean
 Ira F. Kilmer
 General Attendant: Louis Scheller
 Gallery Attendants:
 Albert Stoppenbach
 G. W. Brower
 Louis Scheller
 Committee Room Attendants: 
 Charles Kache
 William Vliet
 J. Lonzo
 Document Room Attendant: John W. Liebenstein
 Porter: Joseph Stanton
 Flagman: S. G. Pelkey
 Night Watch: Charles Gutman
 Wash Room Attendant: J. F. Hartel
 Coat Room Attendant: William Murphy
 Assistant Coat Room Attendant: P. C. Eliott
 Janitor: T. Kavanaugh
 Messengers:
 Archie McCoy
 Otto Gartner
 Arthur Gardner
 August Krueger
 Everett Monohan
 Ed Fitzgerald
 George Haganah
 Frank Coughlin
 James Whitty
 John Gray
 Louis Oyen
 Alven Erickson

Notes

References

External links
 1891: Related Documents from Wisconsin Legislature

1891 in Wisconsin
1892 in Wisconsin
Wisconsin
Wisconsin
Wisconsin legislative sessions